Historiens 100 viktigaste svenskar (History's 100 Most Important Swedes) is a book by Niklas Ekdal and Petter Karlsson, published in 2009. Before the book was released, the list was published by Dagens Nyheter between 14 April and 6 May. The book is a list of the 100 Swedes that according to the authors has had "the greatest influence on Swedish people's lives, and also people's lives around the world". There are 84 men and 16 women on the list. Around 40 of them lived in the previous century, and 16 were still alive as of the book's publication.


Selection criteria
The selection criteria were:"How much, how long, and how many people has the person influenced – primarily domestically but also internationally – with his thoughts, his reign, his deeds or his example? And how much does this person mean to us living here today, in 2009?"

The list
 Gustav I of Sweden (1496–1560), king (reigned 1523–1560), the founding father of modern Sweden
 Astrid Lindgren (1907–2002), author, writer of children's books including the Pippi Longstocking series
 Axel Oxenstierna (1583–1654), statesman, Lord High Chancellor from 1612–1654. Confidant of both Gustavus Adolphus and Queen Christina.
 Alfred Nobel (1833–1896), inventor, founder of the Nobel Prize
 Olof Palme (1927–1986), socialist politician, Prime Minister (1969–1976 and 1982–1986)
 Marcus Wallenberg (1899–1982), industrialist and banker
 Evert Taube (1890–1976), composer
 Lars Magnus Ericsson (1846–1926), inventor, entrepreneur and founder of telephone equipment manufacturer Ericsson
 Charles XIV John (1763–1844), king (reigned 1818–1844)
 Carl Larsson (1853–1919), painter
 St. Bridget (1303–1373), saint
 Johan August Gripenstedt (1813–1874), Finance Minister (1856–1866), liberal reformer and free trader
 Odin (170–240), king, later considered the chief god in Norse paganism
 August Strindberg (1849–1912), playwright and writer
 Charles XI (1655–1697), king (reigned 1660–1697)
 Carl Michael Bellman (1740–1795), poet and composer
 Anders Chydenius (1729–1803), priest, early Classical Liberal theorist
 Ingvar Kamprad (1926–2018), entrepreneur, founder of IKEA
 Ingmar Bergman (1918–2007), director
 Gustav III (1746–1792), king (reigned 1771–1792)
 Carl Linnaeus (1707–1778), botanist, founder of the modern scheme of binomial nomenclature
 Charles XII (1682–1718), king (reigned 1697–1718), skilled military leader and tactician of the Great Northern War
 Selma Lagerlöf (1858–1940), author
 Rutger Macklean II (1742–1816), land reformist
 Albert Bonnier (1820–1900), publicist
 Dag Hammarskjöld (1905–1961), diplomat, Secretary-General of the United Nations 1953–1961
 Per Albin Hansson (1885–1946), Prime Minister (1932–1946)
 Ellen Key (1849–1926), writer
 Lennart Hyland (1919–1993), TV-show host and journalist
 Gustav IV Adolf of Sweden (1778–1837), king (reigned 1792–1809)
 Assar Gabrielsson (1891–1962), industrialist, co-founder of Volvo
 Björn Borg (1956– ), tennis legend, winner of five consecutive Wimbledon tournaments 1976–1980
 John Ericsson (1803–1889), mechanical engineer, inventor of the two screw-propeller and iron warship USS Monitor
 Hans Alfredson (1931—2017), entertainer
 Tage Danielsson (1928–1985), entertainer
 Jonas Wenström (1855–1893), engineer, inventor of the three-phase electric power system, the basis for ASEA (later ABB Group)
 Karl Staaff (1860–1915), Prime Minister, chairman of the Liberal Coalition Party 1907–1915 and champion of universal suffrage
 Vilhelm Moberg (1898–1973), author
 Erik Gustaf Geijer (1783–1847), historian
 Raoul Wallenberg (1912–?), diplomat
 Carl Olof Rosenius (1816–1868), preacher
 Christopher Polhem (1661–1751), scientist, inventor and industrialist, significant contributor to industrial development, particularly in mining
 Olaus Petri (1493–1552), reformist
 Hjalmar Branting (1860–1925), Prime Minister
 Gustavus Adolphus (1594–1632), king (reigned 1611–1632), founder of the Swedish Empire and the Golden Age of Sweden.
 Fredrika Bremer (1801–1865), author
 Oscar I (1799–1859), king (reigned 1844–1859)
 Jan Stenbeck (1942–2002), capitalist, founder of MTG, Tele2, Millicom and leading global free newspaper company Metro
 Anna Maria Roos (1862–1938), author
 Stig Anderson (1931–1997), music producer, manager of ABBA
 Ivar Kreuger (1880–1932), financier and industrialist
 Carl Edvard Johansson (1864–1943), scientist, inventor of the gauge block set
 Birger Jarl (1210–1266), statesman, played a pivotal role in the consolidation of Sweden, founded Stockholm in 1250
 Urban Hjärne (1641–1724), physician
 Lennart Nilsson (1922—2017), photographer
 Olaus Rudbeck (1630–1702), scientist and writer
 Greta Garbo (1905–1990), actor
 Engelbrekt Engelbrektsson (1390–1436), rebel leader and statesman
 Lars Johan Hierta (1801–1872), newspaperman
 Alice Tegnér (1864–1943), composer
 Carl Jonas Love Almqvist (1793–1866), author
 Gunnar Myrdal (1898–1987), professor
 Alva Myrdal (1902–1986), politician
 Carl Wilhelm Scheele (1742–1786), pharmaceutical chemist
 Arvid Horn (1664–1742), politician, President of the Privy Council Chancellery (1710–1719 and 1720–1738)
 Cajsa Warg (1703–1769), cookbook author
 Anders Celsius (1701–1744), scientist
 Benny Andersson (1946– ), musician and composer, member of ABBA
 Björn Ulvaeus (1945– ), musician and composer, member of ABBA
 Carl Grimberg (1875–1941), historian
 Sven Hedin (1865–1952), explorer
 Jöns Jakob Berzelius (1779–1848), chemist, worked out the modern technique of chemical formula notation, and considered one of the fathers of modern chemistry
 Erik Johan Stagnelius (1793–1823), poet
 Gunnar Sträng (1906–1992), Finance Minister (1955–1976)
 Emanuel Swedenborg (1688–1772), scientist, philosopher and theologian
 Gustaf Fröding (1860–1911), poet and writer
 Zlatan Ibrahimović (1981– ), soccer player
 Eva Ekeblad (1724–1786), agronomist and scientist
 Carl-Adam Nycop (1909–2006), newspaper editor
 Bruno Liljefors (1860–1939), artist, influential wildlife painter of the late 19th and early 20th century
 Jan Guillou (1944– ), journalist
 Esaias Tegnér (1782–1846), poet
 Peter Wieselgren (1800–1873), temperance movement leader
 Lars Norén (1944–2021), playwright, novelist and poet
 Anita Ekberg (1931–2015), actor
 Carl af Forsell (1783–1848), statistician
 Karl Gerhard (1891–1964), entertainer
 Georg Stiernhielm (1598–1672), polymath
 August Palm (1849–1922), agitator, key socialist and labour movement activist
 Barbro Svensson (1938–2018), singer
 Viktor Balck (1844–1928), original IOC member and "the father of Swedish sports"
 Kjell-Olof Feldt (1931– ), Finance Minister
 Magnus Eriksson (1316–1374), king (reigned 1319–1374)
 Nathan Söderblom (1866–1931), Archbishop, one of the principal founders of the ecumenical movement
 Inga-Britt Ahlenius (1939– ), auditor
 Gustaf de Laval (1845–1913), inventor
 Sven-Göran Eriksson (1948– ), soccer manager
 Elin Wägner (1882–1949), writer
 Jan Carlzon (1941– ), management guru
 Queen Christina (1626–1689), monarch (reigned 1632–1654)

Criticism
Criticism has been voiced over the list, both in terms of selection and ranking.

Selection
It has been argued that the following people should have made it to the list:
 Ernst Wigforss (1881–1977), Finance Minister (1925–1926, 1932–1936 and 1936–1949) and socialist ideologue
 Charles X Gustav of Sweden (1622–1660), king (reigned 1656–1660), marched across the Belts to conquer the eastern half of Denmark which has remained Swedish ever since
 Erik Dahlbergh (1625–1703), engineer, painter, and field marshal, the "Vauban of Sweden"
 Nicodemus Tessin (1654–1728), Baroque architect, city planner, and administrator
 Elise Ottesen-Jensen (1886–1973), sex educator, journalist, anarchist agitator and women's rights activist
 Arne Beurling (1905–1986), mathematician, single-handedly deciphered the Nazi Germany Geheimfernschreiber
 Ingemar Johansson (1932–2008), heavyweight boxing champion of the world (1959–1960)
 Ingemar Stenmark (1956–), the greatest slalom and giant slalom specialist of all time
 Bo Jonsson Grip (1330s–1386), head of the royal council, Sweden's (and Finland's) largest landowner ever
 Povel Ramel (1922–2007), singer, pianist, vaudeville artist, songwriter, author and novelty song composer
 Percy Barnevik (1941–), businessman, CEO/Chairman ASEA/ABB (1980–2002), GM board member (1996–2009)
 Carl Bildt (1949–), politician and diplomat, Prime Minister (1991–1994), EU/UN Special Envoy to the Balkans (1995–2001)
 Herman Bernhard Lundborg (1868–1943), physician, racialist and eugenicist
 Anders Retzius (1796–1860), anatomy professor credited with defining the cephalic index and retropubic space
 Tage Erlander (1901–1985), leader of the Social Democratic Party and Prime Minister (1946–1969)
 Bruno Mathsson (1907–1988), furniture designer and architect with ideas colored by functionalism/modernism
 Oscar II (1829–1907), king (reigned 1872–1907), renounced the Norwegian throne, ending the Sweden-Norway Union
 Anders Zorn (1860–1920), painter, sculptor and printmaker
 Carl Milles (1875–1955), sculptor
 Carl Olof Cronstedt (1756–1820), naval commander responsible for the overwhelming Swedish victory at the Svensksund, one of the largest naval battles in history
 Joe Hill (1879–1915), Swedish-American labor activist and songwriter
 Jenny Lind (1820–1887), opera singer known as the "Swedish Nightingale"
 Magnus Ladulås (1240–1290), king (reigned 1275–1290)
 Esaias Tegnér (1782–1846), writer, professor of Greek language, and bishop
 Tim Bergling (1989–2018), world-famous DJ and remixer, also known as "Avicii"

Ranking
The ranking has been hotly contested and arguments include:
 The authors' liberal orientation has given undue prominence to other liberals such as Chydenius and Gripenstedt while downplaying the impact of socialists such as Branting, Palm and Per Albin Hansson.
 Internationally famous persons such as J. J. Berzelius, Queen Christina and John Ericsson have lost out to populist choices (Evert Taube, Astrid Lindgren), fads (Zlatan Ibrahimovic, Kjell-Olof Feldt) and "overvalued dreamers" (Sven Hedin, Carl Grimberg).
 Inclusion of the authors' employer Albert Bonnier as number 25 undermines the credibility of the list.

See also
 100 Greatest Britons – Television series

References

External links 
 Dagens Nyheter: Historiens 100 viktigaste svenskar

Sweden
Lists of Swedish people
Works originally published in Swedish newspapers